Ricardo González Rotela (born 7 February 1945) is a Paraguayan footballer. He played in 15 matches for the Paraguay national football team from 1965 to 1968. He was also part of Paraguay's squad for the 1967 South American Championship.

References

External links
 Ricardo González at BDFutbol
 

1945 births
Living people
People from Piribebuy
Paraguayan footballers
Paraguay international footballers
Association football defenders
Cerro Porteño players
Elche CF players
Levante UD footballers
La Liga players
Segunda División players
Paraguayan expatriate footballers
Paraguayan expatriate sportspeople in Spain
Expatriate footballers in Spain